Paolo Biancucci (1583–1653) was born at Lucca and was a pupil of Guido Reni, and influenced by Sassoferrato. He painted a Purgatory, for the church of the Suffragio, and an altar-piece of several Saints for San Francesco.

References

1583 births
1653 deaths
Painters from Lucca
16th-century Italian painters
Italian male painters
17th-century Italian painters
Italian Baroque painters